Reitter is a German occupational surname, which means a "mounted soldier" or "knight", from the Middle High German ritære ("horseman"). Notable people with the surname include:

 Edmund Reitter (1845–1920), a Moravia-born Austrian-German entomologist, writer, collector, beetle expert
 Edmund Reitter (1904–2005), an Austrian sculptor
 Ferenc Reitter (1813–1874), a Hungarian architect and engineer
 Brauerei Reitter, a brand of German micro-brew

See also 
 Reiter (surnames)
 Reiter

References

German-language surnames